Wãpha, or Wase (Jukun Wase) after the district in which it is spoken, is a Jukunoid language of Nigeria.

References

Jukunoid languages
Languages of Nigeria